Feodor Vassilyev (older spelling: Ѳеодоръ Васильевъ) (c. 1707 1782) was a peasant from Shuya, Russia. His first wife is said to have lived to be 76, and between 1725 and 1765, have had 69 children (16 pairs of twins, 7 sets of triplets, and 4 sets of quadruplets); 67 of them survived infancy with the loss of one set of twins: the record for most children born to a single woman. However, their names, dates of birth, and dates of death are all unknown.

Vassilyev said he also had 18 children with his second wife (6 pairs of twins and 2 sets of triplets), making him allegedly a father of 87 children in total.

The data about Vassilyev's children are included in the Guinness Book of World Records.

Sources
The first published account about Feodor Vassilyev's children appeared in a 1783 issue of The Gentleman's Magazine (Vol. 53 p. 753, London, 1783) and states that the information "however astonishing, may be depended upon, as it came directly from an English merchant in St Petersburg to his relatives in England, who added that the peasant was to be introduced to the Empress".

Skepticism
Several published sources raised doubts as to the veracity of these statements. According to a 1933 article by Julia Bell in Biometrika, a 1790 book of B. F. J. Hermann Statistische Schilderung von Rußland did provide the statements about Feodor Vassilyev's children but "with a caution".  Bell also notes that the case was reported by The Lancet in an 1878 article about the study of twins. The Lancet article states that the French Academy of Sciences attempted to verify the statements about Vassilyev's children and contacted "M. Khanikoff of the Imperial Academy of St Petersburg for advice as to the means they should pursue, but were told by him that all investigation was superfluous, that members of the family still lived in Moscow and that they had been the object of favors from the Government".  Bell concludes that Vassilyev's case "must be regarded as under suspicion".

Similarly, in her book Quadruplets and Higher Multiple Births (1989), Marie Clay of the University of Auckland notes: "Sadly, this evasion of proper investigation seems, in retrospect, to have dealt a terminal blow to our chances of ever establishing the true detail of this extraordinary case".

See also
 List of multiple births
 List of people with the most children

References

1707 births
1782 deaths
History of human sexuality
People from Shuya
Multiple births
18th-century people from the Russian Empire